Andreyevsky Bridge name refers to a historical bridge demolished in 1998 and three existing bridges across Moskva River, located between Luzhniki and Gorky Park in Moscow.

Andreyevsky Rail Bridge (1907, demolished 1998) 
The original Sergievsky Bridge (Сергиевский мост), named after the late  Grand Duke Sergei Alexandrovich, and its twin, Nicholas II Bridge (Мост Николая II, later Krasnoluzhsky Bridge) were built in 1903–1907, replacing temporary wooden truss bridges of the Moscow Inner Ring Railroad. New bridges were designed as through arch bridges by Lavr Proskuryakov (structural engineering) and Alexander Pomerantsev (architectural design). The 135 meter wide, 15 metre tall steel arch (1400 metric tons) was made at Votkinsk works. Proskuryakov's work, considered a marvel of engineering, was proven by the 1908 flood: water level exceeded the maximum design specification by a metre and a half; the bridges stood unharmed.
 
After the February Revolution of 1917, Romanov names were erased from the map. Sergievsky Bridge was renamed Andreyevsky after nearby St.Andrew’s monastery, Nicholas II Bridge became Krasnoluzhsky Bridge.
 
In 1937, the arched stone pillars over embankments were extended from one to two spans (each side) to accommodate increased street traffic. A similar reconstruction of Krasnoluzhsky Bridge was completed in 1956.
 
The bridge was still in good order when it was demolished to make way for the construction of the Third Ring highway. Space limitations required vertical and horizontal realignment of track (1.5 metres up and 22 metres downstream  ), so the whole rail bridge (arch, roadway and pillars) had to be rebuilt on a new site (unlike Krasnoluzhsky bridge, which retained its pillars). Demolition (actually, careful disassembly) began in April 1998.

Pushkinsky Pedestrian Bridge (2000) 

 
Instead of scrapping the steel arch of the 1907 Andreyevsky Rail Bridge, city planners re-used it as a structural core for the new pedestrian bridge. May 22, 1999, three barges towed the steel frame to the new anchorage, 1.5 kilometre downstream. By this time, contractors already set up concrete foundations, pillars and arches at the new site; they were finished with granite slabs salvaged from the old site. Moskva river at this point is wider than at St.Andrew’s, so four pillars and three 25-meter arches over water were required to close the gaps.
 
Pushkinsky bridge connects First Frunzenskaya street in Khamovniki (left bank) with the southern edge of Gorky Park and Titovsky Proezd leading to Leninsky Avenue (right bank). Design team was led by Yu.P.Platonov. Main pedestrian walkway and stairs are completely enclosed in a glass canopy; there are two open-air side walkways. Left bank entrance has a two-lane escalator. On the right bank, the main flat walkway extends 240 metres past the pillars through the park.

Andreyevsky Rail Bridge (2001) 
Initially, rail bridge completion had a higher priority and a 15-month fast track schedule, but in real life priorities changed, and the new road bridge was completed first. The old railway bridge, repaired many times, was no longer able to cope with modern demands  - In 1998, the speed of trains on the bridge had to be reduced to 40 kilometres per hour -  and the decision was taken to dismantle it and build two new bridges at the same location: a railway bridge and a road bridge. Both jobs required removal of old rail bridge, which was done May 22, 1999, after 11 months of preparation. A road bridge of the Third Ring Road and a new railway bridge, both called the Andreyevsky Bridge, are built in its former place.
A special feature of the new bridge is its 3% slope towards Luzhniki.
Rail service of the Inner Ring was suspended for two years until completion in 2001.
 
New steel arch (engineer S.S.Tkachenko) is superficially similar to Proskuryakov's original design; it is now 21.5 metre tall, with a higher track alignment; width remains the same, 135.0 metres. The bridge has only one (upstream) pedestrian walkway and two copies of four original obelisks.

Andreyevsky Road Bridge (2000) 
New Andreyevsky Road Bridge (Aндреевский автодорожный мост) was completed in December 2000. Design challenge included merging the bridge with the tunnel system under Gagarin Square. Significant incline of roadway ruled out the box girder style in favor of concrete truss arch bridge (lead designer E.G.Gapontsev), set on a 32-metre deep pile foundation. The arch is 135 meters wide and 15 meters high; 39-meter wide roadway has 8 lanes for regular traffic and a single pedestrian and bicycle walkway.
 
An effective and economical solution, however, failed to preserve visual coherence of two adjacent bridges; new structure completely obstructs the fine outline of Proskuryakov's classic
.

See also 
Krasnoluzhsky Bridge
List of bridges in Moscow

References

External links
walks.ru
 
Bridges in Moscow
Railway bridges in Russia
Pedestrian bridges in Russia
Through arch bridges
Bridges completed in 1907
Bridges completed in 2000
Bridges completed in 2001
Concrete bridges
Road bridges in Russia